Shivam Chaudhary (born 4 August 1997) is an Indian first-class cricketer who plays for Railways. He made his first-class debut for Uttar Pradesh in the 2014–15 Ranji Trophy on 6 February 2015. He made his Twenty20 debut for Uttar Pradesh in the 2016–17 Inter State Twenty-20 Tournament on 5 February 2017. He made his List A debut for Uttar Pradesh in the 2016–17 Vijay Hazare Trophy on 1 March 2017.
He represented india under-23 in youth asia cup held in Bangladesh.

References

External links
 

1997 births
Living people
Indian cricketers
Uttar Pradesh cricketers